Sprankle Mills is a small unincorporated rural community in Jefferson County, Pennsylvania, United States.  It is located between the boroughs of Punxsutawney and Brookville.

History
Sprankle Mills was founded in 1833 by Frederick Sprankle,  who owned a mill in the middle of town. A post office was established at Sprankle Mills in 1857, and remained in operation until 1984.

References

Unincorporated communities in Pennsylvania
Unincorporated communities in Jefferson County, Pennsylvania
1833 establishments in Pennsylvania